Destination Mars is a juvenile science fiction novel, the sixth in Hugh Walters' Chris Godfrey of U.N.E.X.A. series. It was published in the UK by Faber in 1963 and in the US by Criterion Books in 1964. 
Also published in German by Schneider Buch as Der Chor der Verdammten ("The Choir of the Damned") in 1983, and in Portuguese by Galeria Panorama in 1969 as Destino Marte.

Plot summary
The first man to pass close to Mars is driven insane by strange 'voices' he hears on his radio. He is unable to record the voices as the Van Allen radiation belts wipe the magnetic tapes clean, so doubt is cast on his account. 
U.N.E.X.A. (United Nations Exploration Agency) send their crack team (Chris Godfrey, Serge Smyslov, Morrey Kant and Tony Hale) to investigate.  After landing on the planet's surface they find traces of an ancient civilization, but then a disembodied Martian appears and demands its people be transported to Earth, where they will enslave the human race. One-by-one the crew are taken over.

This novel introduces the concept of the Ion drive, allowing continuous acceleration of one-fifth g.

External links
Destination Mars page

1963 British novels
1963 science fiction novels
Chris Godfrey of U.N.E.X.A. series
Faber and Faber books
Novels set on Mars
1963 children's books